Hourani also written Hawrani, Horani, Horany, Haurani, Howrani and Hurani  (in Arabic حوراني) is a common Levantine Arabic surname. Haurani is also a reference to inhabitants of Hauran, a region in southwestern Syria.

Notable people with the surname include:

Persons

Hourani
 Ahmed Al-Hourani (born 1991), Jordanian football player 
 Albert Hourani (1915–1993), British historian of Lebanese descent
 Dominique Hourani (born 1985), Lebanese recording artist, actress, beauty queen, and former model 
 Eid Hourany (1940–2008), Lebanese nuclear physicist
 Farid Hourani (1928–2014), Lebanese-American physician and author
 George Hourani (1913–1984), British philosopher, historian, and classicist of Lebanese descent 
 Hasan Hourani (1974–2003), Palestinian artist
 Husam Hourani, Syrian football player
 Rad Hourani (born 1982), Canadian French designer, photographer and artist
 Youssef Hourany (1931–2019), Lebanese writer, archeologist and historian

Hawrani 
 Akram al-Hawrani (1912–1996), Syrian politician

Hourani
 Waleed Hourani (born 1948), Lebanese composer and pianist

Arabic-language surnames
Nisbas